Rocco Design Architects Associates Limited, led by Rocco Yim, is a design architectural practice based in Hong Kong. It is responsible for the design of many iconic buildings in Hong Kong and Guangdong province, including the Hong Kong Government Headquarters, iSQUARE, One Peking Road, Yunnan Museum and Guangdong Museum. It employs 160 staff in Hong Kong and Shenzhen.

Rocco S.K. Yim founded its predecessor firm Rocco Design Architects Limited in March 1979. Patrick P.W. Lee joined Rocco Design Partners in June 1980.

The firm exhibited four times at the Venice Biennale in 2002, 2006, 2010 and 2012. In 2015, the practice was invited to showcase their work at Architecture Forum Berlin, in the dedicated Exhibition titled "Intensity: the works of Rocco Design Architects, Hong Kong".

Awards

The firm has received numerous awards, ARCASIA Gold Medals in 1994 and 2003, the Chicago Athenaeum Architectural Awards in 2006, 2011 and 2013, the Kenneth F. Brown Award in 2007, and the World Architecture Festival category winner in 2011.

Within the latest projects, The Yunnan Museum, opened to the public in 2015, has received a "HKIA Hong Kong Medal of the Year", and two Honorable Mentions at the International Design Awards 14 and Architizer Awards 2016.

Notable works

 Chinese University of Hong Kong, Shenzhen Campus
 Bao'an Cultural Complex
 Wesleyan House Methodist International Church
iSQUARE
Yunnan Museum 
HKSAR Government Headquarters
 One Peking Road
Citibank Plaza
Man Yee Building
China Online Centre
Victoria Towers
Guangdong Museum
Hong Kong Palace Museum (planned)

Gallery

Further reading
 Being Chinese in Architecture: Recent Works in China by Rocco Design. 2004. .
 Presence: The Architecture of Rocco Design. 2013. .
 Reconnecting Cultures: The Architecture of Rocco Design. 2013. .
 Add to My Reading List

References

External links
 

Architecture firms of Hong Kong
Architecture firms of China